Elections to North Tyneside Metropolitan Council took place on 1 May 2008 on the same day as other local council elections in England.

North Tyneside Council is elected "in thirds" which means one councillor from each three-member ward is elected each year with a fourth year when the mayoral election takes place.

One-third of the councillors were elected in 2008. The Conservative Party gained an overall majority of one on the council after the election which previously had been under no overall control. However the directly elected mayor, John Harrison, belongs to the Labour Party, meaning Labour remained in effective control of the council, as he can only be overruled by a two-thirds majority of the council.

Battle Hill

Benton

Camperdown

Chirton

Collingwood

Cullercoats

Howdon

Killingworth

Longbenton

Monkseaton North

A further by-election was held in June 2008. Details can be found here.

Monkseaton South

Northumberland

Preston

A further by-election was held on 24 September 2009. Details can be found here.

Riverside

St Mary's

Tynemouth

A further by-election was held on 5 February 2009. Details can be found here.

Valley

The sitting councillor, Angela Potter, had previously defected to the Liberal Democrats from the Labour Party.

Wallsend

Weetslade

Whitley Bay

References 

2008 English local elections
2008
21st century in Tyne and Wear